Pomacentridae is a family of ray-finned fish, comprising the damselfishes and clownfishes. This family were formerly placed in the order Perciformes but are now regarded as being incertae sedis in the subseries Ovalentaria in the clade Percomorpha.
They are primarily marine, while a few species inhabit freshwater and brackish environments (e.g., Neopomacentrus aquadulcis, N. taeniurus, Pomacentrus taeniometopon, Stegastes otophorus). They are noted for their hardy constitutions and territoriality.  Many are brightly colored, so they are popular in aquaria.

Around 385 species are classified in this family, in about 31 genera. Of these, members of two genera, Amphiprion and  Premnas, are commonly called clownfish or anemonefish, while members of other genera (e.g., Pomacentrus) are commonly called damselfish.  The members of this family are classified in four subfamilies: Amphiprioninae, Chrominae, Lepidozyginae, and Pomacentrinae.

Etymology
The name of the family is derived from the Greek words; poma roughly translates to the English "cover", referring to the fishes' opercula, and kentron is Greek for sting. The name refers to the serrations found along the margins of the opercular bones in many members of this family.

Distribution and habitat
Pomacentrids are found primarily in tropical seas, with a few species occurring in subtropical waters (e.g., Hypsypops rubicundus). Most species are found on or near coral reefs in the Indo-West Pacific (from East Africa to Polynesia). The area from the Philippines to Australia hosts the greatest concentration of species. The remaining species are found in the Atlantic or eastern Pacific. Some species are native to freshwater or brackish estuarine environments.

Most species are specialists, living in specific parts of the reef, such as sandy lagoons, steep reef slopes, or areas exposed to strong wave action. In general, the coral is used as shelter, and many species can only survive in its presence.

The bottom-dwelling species are territorial, occupying and defending a portion of the reef, often centered on shelter. By keeping away other species of fish, some pomacentrids encourage the growth of thick mats of algae within their territories, leading to the common name farmerfish.

Characteristics

Pomacentrids have an orbiculate to elongated body shape, which is often laterally compressed.  They have interrupted or incomplete lateral lines and they usually have a single nostril on each side (some species of Chromis and Dascyllus have two on each side).  They have small- to medium-sized ctenoid scales. They have one or two rows of teeth, which may be conical or spatulate.

They display a wide range of colors, predominantly bright shades of yellow, red, orange, and blue, although some are a relatively drab brown, black, or grey. The young are often a different, brighter color than adults.

Pomacentrids are omnivorous or herbivorous, feeding on algae, plankton, and small bottom-dwelling crustaceans, depending on their precise habitats. Only a small number of genera, such as Cheiloprion, eat the coral where they live.

They also engage in symbiotic relationship with cleaner gobies of genus Elacatinus, allowing the gobies to feed on ectoparasites on their bodies.

Lifecycle
Before breeding, the males clear an area of algae and invertebrates to create a nest. They engage in ritualised courtship displays, which may consist of rapid bursts of motion, chasing or nipping females, stationary hovering, or wide extension of their fins. After being attracted to the site, the female lays a string of sticky eggs that attach to the substrate. The male swims behind the female as she lays the eggs, and fertilises them externally. Varying by species, brood sizes range from 50 to 1000 eggs.

The male guards the nest for the two to seven days needed for the eggs to hatch. They go through a pelagic stage, which depending on the species, can last as little as a week or more than a month. When they arrive at a suitable environment, the young settle and adopt their juvenile colors.

In captivity, pomacentrids live up to 18 years, but they probably do not live longer than 10 to 12 years in the wild.

Genera
The 5th edition of Fishes of the World recognises 31 genera in three subfamilies in the family Pomacentridae:

† means extinct
 
 Subfamily Chrominae  Allen, 1975
 Acanthochromis Gill, 1863:
 Altrichthys Allen, 1999
 Azurina D.S. Jordan & McGregor, 1898
 Chromis Cuvier, 1814
 Dascyllus Cuvier, 1829
 Subfamily Lepidozyginae Allen, 1975
 Lepidozygus Günther, 1862
 Subfamily Pomacentrinae Bonaparte, 1831
 Abudefduf Fabricius, 1775
 Amblyglyphidodon Bleeker, 1877
 Amblypomacentrus Bleeker, 1877
 Amphiprion Bloch & Schneider, 1801
 Cheiloprion M.C.W. Weber, 1913
 Chrysiptera Swainson, 1839
 Dischistodus Gill, 1863
 Hemiglyphidodon Bleeker, 1877
 Hypsypops Gill, 1861
 Mecaenichthys Whitley , 1929
 Microspathodon Günther, 1862
 Neoglyphidodon Allen, 1991
 Neopomacentrus Allen, 1975
 Nexilosus Heller & Snodgrass, 1903
 Parma Günther, 1862
 Plectroglyphidodon Fowler & Ball, 1824
 Pomacentrus Lacépède, 1802
 Pomachromis Allen & Randall, 1974
 Premnas Cuvier, 1816
 Pristotis Rüppell, 1838
 Similiparma Hemsley, 1986
 Stegastes Jenyns, 1840
 Teixeirichthys J. L. B. Smith, 1953
 †Palaeopomacentrus Bellwood & Sorbini, 1996 

Other authoritiies recognise 4 subfamilies and classify the family as follows: 

 
 Subfamily Chrominae
 Azurina
 Chromis
 Dascyllus 
 Pycnochromis Fowler, 1941
 Subfamily Glyphisodontinae
 Abudefduf 
 Subfamily Microspathodontinae
 Hypsypops 
 Lepidozygus
 Mecaenichthys
 Microspathodon
 Nexilosus
 Parma (fish)|Parma
 Plectroglyphidodon
 Similiparma
 Stegastes
 Subfamily Pomacentrindeae
 Acanthochromis
 Altrichthys
 Amblyglyphidodon
 Amblypomacentrus
 Clownfish|Amphiprion 
 Cheiloprion
 Chrysiptera
 Dischistodus
 Hemiglyphidodon
 Neoglyphidodon
 Neopomacentrus
 Pomacentrus
 Pomachromis
 Premnas 
 Pristotis
 Teixeirichthys
 †Palaeopomacentrus

Timeline

References

External links

 
 Smith, J.L.B. 1960. Coral fishes of the family Pomacentridae from the Western Indian Ocean and the Red Sea. Ichthyological Bulletin; No. 19. Department of Ichthyology, Rhodes University, Grahamstown, South Africa.
 Species inventory of Pomacentridae from New Caledonia.

 
Labroidei
Ovalentaria
Ray-finned fish families
Taxa named by Charles Lucien Bonaparte